Air Marshal Sir William Edward Coles  & Bar, AFC (26 July 1913 – 7 June 1979) was a Royal Air Force officer who served as Air Officer Commanding-in-Chief Technical Training Command from 1966 to 1968. Coles was also a British bobsledder who competed in the late 1940s as part of an RAF team.

RAF career
Coles joined the Royal Air Force in 1938. He served in the Second World War as Officer Commanding No. 117 Squadron and as Officer Commanding No. 233 Squadron. After the war he became a Staff Officer at the Air Ministry before joining the Central Flying School. He was appointed Station Commander at RAF Middleton St. George in 1950, Chief Flying Instructor at the Central Flying School in 1951 and Air Adviser to the High Commissioner to Australia in 1953. He went on to be Senior Air Staff Officer at Headquarters No. 3 (Bomber) Group in 1957, Air Officer Commanding No. 23 (Training) Group in 1960 and Director-General of RAF Personal Services in 1963. His last appointment was as Air Officer Commanding-in-Chief Technical Training Command in 1966 before retiring in 1968.

He was the subject of This Is Your Life in 1974 when he was surprised by Eamonn Andrews.

In retirement he became President of the Not Forgotten Association and Controller of the RAF Benevolent Fund.

Sport
At the 1948 Winter Olympics in St. Moritz, he finished fifth in the two-man and seventh in the four-man events.

References

|-
 

1913 births
1979 deaths
Companions of the Distinguished Service Order
Companions of the Order of the Bath
Knights Commander of the Order of the British Empire
Bobsledders at the 1948 Winter Olympics
Recipients of the Air Force Cross (United Kingdom)
Recipients of the Distinguished Flying Cross (United Kingdom)
Recipients of the Distinguished Flying Cross (United States)
Royal Air Force air marshals
Royal Air Force personnel of World War II